The Shrine of Living Buddha is a Buddhist temple located at the Divine Light Summit of Mount Jiuhua, in Qingyang County, Anhui, China.

History

Tang dynasty
During the early 8th century, Silla prince Kim Gyo-gak came to Tang Empire to practice sutra and he chose a cave on Mount Jiuhua for his self-cultivation. In 794, in the 10th year of Zhenyuan period, Kim Gyo-gak died, aged 99. His body was founded in the cave three years later, he still had life-like color and soft skin. Monks believed that he was the reincarnation of Kṣitigarbha, so they built a stone pagoda to house his body and named it "Golden Kṣitigarbha". Later a temple was established on the spacious foundation of the pagoda and was named the "Body Hall".

Ming dynasty
In the Wanli period (1573–1620) of the Ming dynasty (1368–1644), the emperor issued the decree rebuilding the Body Hall and inscribed the wooden plaque with Chinese characters "Huguo Roushen Baota".

Qing dynasty
In the reign of Kangxi Emperor (1661–1722) of the Qing dynasty (1644–1911), Yu Chenglong refurbished the halls of the temple. In 1857, during the Xianfeng era (1851–1861), part of the temple was destroyed by wars. In the early Tongzhi period (1862–1874), a flood destroyed some halls of the temple. In 1886, in the 12th year of Guangxi period (1875–1908), the temple was restored by monks.

Republic of China
After the Xinhai Revolution in 1914, the temple was renovated.  In 1917, a plaque with "" (great vow of Kṣitigarbha) written by the then President of the Republic of China Li Yuanhong was hung on the architrave.

People's Republic of China
After the founding of the Communist State, the temple was rebuilt two times in 1955 and 1981. In 1983, the temple was designated as a National Key Buddhist Temple in Han Chinese Area by the State Council of China.

Architecture

The Body Hall
The Body Hall has a pagoda architecture built with stone pillars, red walls, iron tiles and a paved floor of white marble tiles. In the center of the eaves of the hall is a plaque, on which there are the words "The First Mountain in Southeastern China".

In the central of the hall is the seven story wooden pagoda of Kṣitigarbha with a white marble tile base. Over 100 little statues of Kṣitigarbha are enshrined inside of the pagoda. The gold statue of Kṣitigarbha is surrounded by many different sizes of Buddha along with Ten Kings of Hell.

References

Bibliography
 
 

Buddhist temples on Mount Jiuhua
Buildings and structures in Chizhou
Tourist attractions in Chizhou
19th-century establishments in China
19th-century Buddhist temples